Greatest Hits is a compilation album by American rock band Creed. It was released on November 22, 2004, soon after the announcement that the band had broken up in June, and that lead singer Scott Stapp and the other members of the band would go their separate ways (although the band would later reunite in 2009). It consists of every one of Creed's U.S. singles from their first three albums: My Own Prison (1997), Human Clay (1999), and Weathered (2001), only leaving out their international single, "Hide"; the song "What's This Life For" has censored lyrics in this release, and is cut down to 3 minutes and 32 seconds in length. The album also includes a DVD that contains all of the band's music videos and several live performances.

On November 19, 2008, the album was certified 2× Platinum by the RIAA, and by early 2010 the album had sold 2,151,058 copies in the U.S.

Track listing
All songs written by Mark Tremonti and Scott Stapp.

Videos
"My Own Prison"
"What's This Life For"
"Higher"
"With Arms Wide Open"
"What If"
"One Last Breath"
"Don't Stop Dancing"
"Bullets" (Animated)
"My Sacrifice"
"Torn" (Live)
"Higher" (Live)
"Weathered" (Live)

Personnel

Band members
Scott Stapp - Lead vocals
Mark Tremonti - Guitar, backing vocals, bass (tracks 9–13)
Brian Marshall - Bass (tracks 1–8)
Scott Phillips - Drums

Additional musicians
Amie Stapp - Backing vocals on "Don't Stop Dancing"
The Tallahassee Boy's Choir on "Don't Stop Dancing"

Charts

Weekly charts

Year-end charts

Sales and certifications

References

2004 greatest hits albums
Creed (band) albums
2004 video albums
Epic Records compilation albums
Epic Records video albums
Music video compilation albums
Wind-up Records compilation albums
Wind-up Records video albums